School of Biological Sciences may refer to:

Cold Spring Harbor Laboratory School of Biological Sciences
Irell & Manella Graduate School of Biological Sciences
School of Biological Sciences, University of Manchester
UCI School of Biological Sciences
UEA School of Biological Sciences
University of Sydney School of Biological Sciences